Roswell Hart (August 4, 1824 – April 20, 1883) was a United States Representative from New York. Born in Rochester, he completed preparatory studies and was graduated from Yale College in 1843, where he was a member of Skull and Bones. He studied law, was admitted to the bar in 1847, and engaged in commercial pursuits.

Hart was elected as a Republican to the 39th United States Congress, holding office from March 4, 1865, to March 4, 1867. He was an unsuccessful candidate for reelection in 1866 to the 40th United States Congress and was superintendent of the Railway Mail Service for the States of New York and Pennsylvania from 1869 to 1876. In 1883 he died in Rochester; interment was in Mount Hope Cemetery.

References

1824 births
1883 deaths
Politicians from Rochester, New York
Yale College alumni
Republican Party members of the United States House of Representatives from New York (state)
19th-century American politicians